Sacred Heart Church is a Roman Catholic church in the centre of Liverpool, England, on the corner of Low Hill and the A57 next to the Royal Liverpool University Hospital. It is a Grade II listed building and was opened in 1886. It was designed by Goldie, Child & Goldie and has an altar piece by Pugin and Pugin.

History
Originally, the Catholics in the area prayed in the chapel of a nearby convent on Mount Vernon Street. With the Catholic population expanding, plans were drawn up for the construction of a church that would accommodate the increasing numbers. It was opened in 1886 and the core elements of the church, such as the nave and exterior, were designed by the architectural firm of George Goldie, Goldie, Child & Goldie Ltd. However two other firms also did work for the church. Augustus Pugin's firm, Pugin & Pugin, designed the sanctuary in the 1890s. Also, Sinnott, Powell & Sinnott, who also designed Our Lady Star of the Sea Church in Seaforth, Merseyside did the church hall in 1894.

There was originally an entrance to the church from Mount Vernon Street, but with the construction of the Royal Liverpool University Hospital, the road became a private access for the hospital and the entrance was blocked off. The main entrance is now on the other side of the church along Low Hill.

Parish
After 2000, the parish was merged with the nearby St Michael's Church, to become the parish of St Michael and the Sacred Heart.

The church has a close relationship with the nearby Sacred Heart Catholic Primary School, with the school frequently doing trips to the church and Liverpool Metropolitan Cathedral.

With the high concentration of Catholic churches in the area, Sacred Heart has its Sunday Mass at a time not to conflict with the other churches, such as St Francis Xavier Church. Its Mass for Sunday is on Saturday evening at 6:30 pm. St Michael's church, in the parish, has its Sunday Mass at 10:30 am.

Gallery

See also

 Archdiocese of Liverpool
 Church of Saint Francis Xavier, Liverpool

References

Sacred Heart Church
Grade II listed churches in Merseyside
Sacred Heart Church
Gothic Revival church buildings in England
Gothic Revival architecture in Merseyside
Roman Catholic churches completed in 1886
19th-century Roman Catholic church buildings in the United Kingdom
Grade II listed Roman Catholic churches in England
1886 establishments in England
George Goldie church buildings